A list of films produced in the United Kingdom in 1961 (see 1961 in film):


1961

See also
1961 in British music
1961 in British radio
1961 in British television
1961 in the United Kingdom

References

External links

1961
Films
Lists of 1961 films by country or language